Amaal Mallik (born 16 June 1990) is an Indian music director, composer, singer, music producer, arranger, background scorer, performer and lyricist. He is the elder son of Daboo Malik and Jyothi Malik, and grandson of Sardar Malik.  He debuted as a composer in 2014 by composing three songs for Salman Khan's Jai Ho, following it up with the song "Naina" from Khoobsurat. He got widely recognition by composing songs for M.S. Dhoni: The Untold Story. He is signed on by Sony Music India

Early life
Amaal Mallik is the elder of two children born to music director Daboo Malik and Jyothi Malik. He was born on June 16, 1990, in Mumbai. He studied in Jamnabai Narsee School and completed his graduation in Bachelor of Commerce from N. M. College in Mumbai. He is brother of singer Armaan Malik.

He started learning music at the age of 8 and took a liking towards the piano. He studied piano and completed his course at Trinity College of Music (Western Classical, Jazz & Rock) under the guidance and training he received from teachers including Benny, Xavier Fernandes, Tony Pinto and Joy Bose. He also trained in Indian classical music informally under the tutelage of his grandfather Sardar Malik.

Career
Mallik began his career journey at a young age. After completing his 10th grade, he immediately went on to assist music composer and background scorer Amar Mohile for the soundtrack of Sarkar (2005) and Shootout at Lokhandwala (2007) at the age of 15, later moving on to producing and arranging music for his father in films like Sohail Khan's Kisaan (2009), for which he collaborated on a remix track of "Mere Desh Ki Dharti" with pop singer, Daler Mehndi.

From 2008 to 2011 Malik produced background scores for Sandeep Chowta and Salim–Sulaiman for films like Rowdy Rathore, R... Rajkumar, Saheb, Biwi Aur Gangster Returns, Heroine, Youngistaan, Ab Tak Chhappan 2, and Phata Poster Nikla Hero. His first outing as a solo background scorer was for Saina, a biopic on the life of ace badminton player Saina Nehwal.

In 2014, he debuted as a music composer. He composed three songs for Salman Khan's film Jai Ho and a song for Khoobsurat.

In 2015, he composed 2 songs for Roy. The song "Sooraj Dooba Hain", sung by Arijit Singh and Aditi Singh Sharma, was the biggest hit of 2015 and earned him a Filmfare Award for Best Music Director along with Ankit Tiwari and Meet Bros. For that song Singh won Filmfare Award for Best Male Playback Singer. Then he composed three songs for Ek Paheli Leela, two of which he composed with Uzair Jaswal, and one he composed alone. He composed a song with Badshah for the film All Is Well. He also composed a song for Hate Story 3 and two songs for Calendar Girls. He composed four songs for Hero, and sang "O Khuda" with Palak Muchhal. In 2015, he composed four singles including "Main Rahoon Ya Na Rahoon".

In 2016, he composed a song for Mastizaade, two songs for Airlift (Soch Na Sake & Tu Bhoola Jise), three songs for Sanam Re (Hua Hain Aaj Pehli Baar, Gazab Ka Hai Yeh Din, Kya Tujhe Ab Ye Dil Bataye), one song for Baaghi, and two songs for Kapoor & Sons, including "Kar Gayi Chull", which he composed with Badshah. He also composed a song for Do Lafzon Ki Kahani, three songs for Azhar, a song for Sarbjit, a song for Baar Baar Dekho, and a song for Force 2. He was the main composer of M.S. Dhoni: The Untold Story. He composed the Hindi, Tamil and Telugu soundtrack of the film. He composed eight songs for the Hindi soundtrack of this film, and Rochak Kohli joined as a guest composer by composing a song for the Hindi soundtrack. In 2016, he composed a single which was sung by Shaan. In 2016, he earned two nominations for Filmfare Award for Best Music Director for Kapoor & Sons along with Badshah, Tanishk Bagchi, Arko Pravo Mukherjee, Benny Dayal and Nucleya; and for Baaghi along with Meet Bros, Ankit Tiwari and Manj Musik.

In 2017, he composed two songs for Badrinath Ki Dulhania, of which he sang "Aashiq Surrender Hua" with Shreya Ghoshal; another, "Roke Na Ruke Naina" was sung by Arijit Singh. Singh won Filmfare Award for Best Male Playback Singer and Mallik earned a nomination of Filmfare Award for Best Music Director along with Tanishk Bagchi an Akhil Sachdeva. Mallik composed all the songs for Noor, and  sang a song with Tulsi Kumar. He composed two songs for Chef, two songs for Golmaal Again, and two songs for Mubarakan; he also sang in the latter. He composed two singles in the same, both sung by his younger brother Armaan Malik.

In 2018, Mallik composed two singles, "Ghar Se Nikalte Hi" and "Ready to Move". Armaan sang in both songs. Mallik also composed a song for Sonu Ke Titu Ki Sweety which earned him IIFA best music director of 2019.

In 2019, Mallik composed two songs, "Kyun Rabba" (sung by Armaan Malik) and "Tum Na Aaye" (sung by K.K.) for the Sujoy Ghosh thriller Badla, which marked him as the youngest composer to compose for Amitabh Bachchan. Mallik was featured as judge in the Indian reality singing show, Sa Re Ga Ma Pa L'il Champs. He next composed "Chale Aana" ,sung by Armaan, for the Luv Ranjan backed De De Pyaar De. He also composed a song for the second highest-grossing film that year, Kabir Singh, which was titled "Yeh Aaina" and sung by Shreya Ghoshal. On July 8, 2020, another single was released under the name of "Zara Thehro", sung by his brother Armaan Malik and Tulsi Kumar under the label T-Series.

In August 2020 he come back with new song 'Dil Ko Maine Di Kasam" music is composed by himself, sung by Arijit Singh, lyrics are penned by Kumaar.

Amaal Mallik announced his debut single titled "Tu Mera Nahi", sung and performed by him in collaboration with Sony Music India.

He announced his upcoming song from Saina (film). In this film Mallik composed 3 songs titled, "Chal Wahin Chale" sung by Shreya Ghoshal, "Main Hoon Na Tere Saath" sung by Armaan Malik and "Parinda" sung by himself.

In September 2021, Mallik, along with Sukriti Kakar and Prakriti Kakar, collaborated with Dua Lipa for Indian remix version of Levitating.

Discography

As a composer

As a singer

Score
 Saina -Background score

Singles

Television

Awards and nominations

References

External links
 

Living people
1990 births
Musicians from Mumbai
University of Mumbai alumni
Filmfare Awards winners
Hindi film score composers
Indian male playback singers
Bollywood playback singers
Jingle composers
Alumni of Trinity College of Music
21st-century Indian composers
Indian male film score composers
21st-century Indian male singers
21st-century Indian singers
Indian composers